Sisyrinchium montanum, the blue-eyed-grass, American blue-eyed-grass, or strict blue-eyed grass, is a grass-like species of plant from the genus Sisyrinchium, native to northern North America from Newfoundland west to easternmost Alaska, and south to Pennsylvania in the east, and to New Mexico in the Rocky Mountains. It has also been introduced to parts of France, likely during the First World War.

It is very similar to S. angustifolium, with which it is sometimes combined.

Description
Its stems have wings with entire to finely toothed margins. The leaves and stem are slender,  broad, green or brownish, with sharp edges and a fine point.

The flowers are produced in a small cyme of two to five together emerging from a spathe, each flower about  diameter, with six purplish tepals with a yellowish base and yellow stamens.

References

 
 Botany Photo of the Day: Sisyrinchium montanum

montanum
Alpine flora
Plants described in 1899
Flora of North America